Xenorma leucocrypta is a moth of the family Notodontidae. It is found in Venezuela and Brazil.

The larvae feed on Cecropia species.

References

Moths described in 1909
Notodontidae of South America